Shirley Ohana (or Shirli, ; born 29 December 1983) is an Israeli footballer currently playing for ASA Tel Aviv University as a forward, having previously played for Maccabi Haifa, Maccabi Holon and Maccabi Kishronot Hadera. She was a member of the Israeli national team, since making her debut in 2002, against Poland. Ohana played with both Maccabi Haifa and Maccabi Holon at UEFA Women's Cup.

Honours
Championships (8):
With Maccabi Haifa: 1998–99, 2001–02
With Maccabi Holon: 2002–03, 2004–05, 2005–06, 2006–07, 2007–08, 2008–09
Cup (12):
With Maccabi Haifa: 1998–99, 1999–2000, 2001–02
With Maccabi Holon: 2002–03, 2003–04, 2004–05, 2005–06, 2006–07, 2007–08, 2008–09, 2012–13
 with Maccabi Kishronot Hadera: 2014–15

References

External links

1983 births
Living people
Israeli Jews
Israeli women's footballers
Israel women's international footballers
Maccabi Haifa F.C. (women) players
Maccabi Holon F.C. (women) players
ASA Tel Aviv University players
Women's association football forwards
Israeli people of Moroccan-Jewish descent
Footballers from Tiberias